The guest list at the wedding of Prince Charles and Lady Diana Spencer on 29 July 1981 included many members of royal families from around the world, republican heads of state, and members of the bride's and groom's families. As Prince Charles was heir to the British throne, the event was automatically deemed a "state occasion", formally requiring the invitation of many foreign heads of state; in addition, the marriage of the prince, who remained a bachelor until the age of 32, to the 20-year-old Lady Diana drew much attention from around the world. The guest list for the wedding, which took place at St Paul's Cathedral in London, included 3,500 people.

Relatives of the groom

House of Windsor
 The Queen and The Duke of Edinburgh, the groom's parents
 The Princess Anne, Mrs Phillips, and Captain Mark Phillips, the groom's sister and brother-in-law
 The Prince Andrew, the groom's brother
 The Prince Edward, the groom's brother
 Queen Elizabeth The Queen Mother, the groom's maternal grandmother
 The Princess Margaret, Countess of Snowdon, the groom's maternal aunt
 Viscount Linley, the groom's first cousin
 Lady Sarah Armstrong-Jones, the groom's first cousin (bridesmaid)
 Princess Alice, Duchess of Gloucester, the groom's maternal great-aunt by marriage
 The Duke and Duchess of Gloucester, the groom's first cousin once removed and his wife
 Earl of Ulster, the groom's second cousin
 The Duke and Duchess of Kent, the groom's first cousin once removed and his wife
 Earl of St Andrews, the groom's second cousin
 Lady Helen Windsor, the groom's second cousin
 Lord Nicholas Windsor, the groom's second cousin (pageboy)
 Princess Alexandra, The Hon. Mrs Ogilvy, and The Hon. Angus Ogilvy, the groom's first cousin once removed and her husband
 James Ogilvy, the groom's second cousin
 Marina Ogilvy, the groom's second cousin
 Prince and Princess Michael of Kent, the groom's first cousin once removed and his wife

Other descendants of Queen Victoria
 The Earl and Countess of Harewood, the groom's first cousin once removed and his wife
 The Hon. Gerald Lascelles and Mrs Lascelles, the groom's first cousin once removed and his wife
 The Duke of Fife, the groom's second cousin once removed
 Captain Alexander Ramsay of Mar and The Lady Saltoun, the groom's second cousin twice removed and his wife

Teck-Cambridge family
 The Marchioness of Cambridge, widow of the groom's first cousin twice removed 
 Lady Mary and Mr Peter Whitley, the groom's second cousin once removed and her husband
 The Duchess and Duke of Beaufort, the groom's first cousin twice removed and her husband
 Lady May and Sir Henry Abel Smith, the groom's first cousin twice removed and her husband

Mountbatten family
 The Countess Mountbatten of Burma and The Lord Brabourne, the groom's first cousin once removed and her husband
 Lord and Lady Romsey, the groom's second cousin and his wife
 The Hon. Michael-John Knatchbull, the groom's second cousin
 Lady Joanna Knatchbull, the groom's second cousin
 Lady Amanda Knatchbull, the groom's second cousin
 The Hon. Philip Knatchbull, the groom's second cousin
 The Hon. Timothy Knatchbull, the groom's second cousin
 Lady Pamela and Mr David Hicks, the groom's first cousin once removed and her husband
 Miss Edwina Hicks, the groom's second cousin
 Mr Ashley Hicks, the groom's second cousin
 Miss India Hicks, the groom's second cousin (bridesmaid)

Bowes-Lyon family
The Earl and Countess of Strathmore and Kinghorne, the groom's first cousin once removed and his wife
The Hon. Margaret and Mr Denys Rhodes, the groom's first cousin once removed and her husband

Relatives of the bride

Spencer family
 The Earl and Countess Spencer, the bride's father and stepmother 
 Lady Sarah and Mr Neil McCorquodale, the bride's sister and brother-in-law
 Lady Jane and Mr Robert Fellowes, the bride's sister and brother-in-law
 Viscount Althorp, the bride's brother
 Lady Anne and Captain Christopher Wake-Walker, the bride's paternal aunt and uncle
 Mrs and Mr Anthony Duckworth-Chad, the bride's first cousin and her husband
 Mr and Mrs David Wake-Walker, the bride's first cousin and his wife
 Mr and Mrs Richard Wake-Walker, the bride's first cousin and his wife
 The Major Michael Wake-Walker, the bride's first cousin
 Mrs and the Major Charles MacFarlane, the bride's first cousin and her husband
 Captain the Hon. George Spencer,  the bride's paternal great-uncle
 Mr Robert Spencer, the bride's first cousin, once removed
 Lady Margaret Douglas-Home, the bride's paternal great-aunt

Roche family
 The Hon. Frances and Mr Peter Shand Kydd, the bride's mother and stepfather
 The Dowager Lady Fermoy, the bride's maternal grandmother
 The Lord and Lady Fermoy, the bride's maternal uncle and aunt
 The Hon. Frances Roche, the bride's first cousin
 The Hon. Maurice Roche, the bride's first cousin
 The Hon. Hugh Roche, the bride's first cousin 
 The Hon. Mary and Mr Michael Gunningham, the bride's maternal aunt and uncle
 Miss Alexandra Berry, the bride's first cousin
 Miss Antonia Berry, the bride's first cousin
 Mr Edward Berry, the bride's first cousin

Hamilton family
The Dowager Duchess of Abercorn, the bride's paternal great-aunt by marriage
The Duke and Duchess of Abercorn, the bride's paternal first cousin, once removed, and his wife

Foreign royalty

Reigning royalty
  The King and Queen of the Belgians, the groom's third cousin, once removed and his wife
  The King of Norway, the groom's first cousin, twice removed
  The Crown Prince and Crown Princess of Norway, the groom's second cousin, once removed, and his wife
  The Queen and Prince Henrik of Denmark, the groom's third cousin, once removed, and her husband
  Prince George Valdemar of Denmark, the groom's second cousin, once removed (and widower of the groom's first cousin, once removed)
  The King and Queen of Sweden, the groom's third cousin, once removed, and his wife
  The Queen and Prince Claus of the Netherlands,
  The Grand Duke and Grand Duchess of Luxembourg, the groom's fourth cousin and his wife, the groom's third cousin
  The Prince and Princess of Liechtenstein,
  The Hereditary Prince and Hereditary Princess of Liechtenstein
  The Princess of Monaco (representing the Prince of Monaco) 
  The Hereditary Prince of Monaco,
  The King and Queen of Tonga
  The Malietoa of Western Samoa
  The Queen of Lesotho (representing the King of Lesotho)
  The Crown Prince and Crown Princess of Japan (representing the Emperor of Japan)
  The Crown Prince and Crown Princess of the Hashemite Kingdom of Jordan (representing the King of Jordan)
  Prince Gyanendra and Princess Komal of Nepal (representing the King of Nepal)
  Princess Maha Chakri Sirindhorn of Thailand (representing the King of Thailand)

Deposed royalty
 The Aga Khan and Begum Salimah Aga Khan
 Prince and Princess Ludwig of Baden, the groom's first cousin and his wife
 Tsar Simeon II and Tsarista Margarita of Bulgaria, the groom's fourth cousin, twice removed, and his wife
 King Constantine II of the Hellenes, the groom's second cousin
 Princess Alexia of Greece and Denmark, the groom's second cousin, once removed
 Crown Prince Pavlos of Greece, the groom's second cousin, once removed
 Prince Nikolaos of Greece and Denmark, the groom's second cousin, once removed
 Prince and Princess George William of Hanover, the groom's paternal uncle and aunt
 Prince and Princess Karl of Hesse, the groom's first cousin and his wife
 Prince Georg of Hanover, the groom's first cousin
 The Princess of Hesse and by Rhine, widow of the groom's first cousin, twice removed
 The Prince and Princess of Hohenlohe-Langenburg, the groom's first cousin and his wife
 Prince and Princess Andreas of Hohenlohe-Langenburg, the groom's first cousin and his wife
 Princess Beatrix of Hohenlohe-Langenburg, the groom's first cousin
 King Michael I and Queen Anne of Romania, the groom's second cousin and his wife, the groom's second cousin, once removed
 Crown Prince Alexander of Yugoslavia, the groom's second cousin, once removed
 Princess Paul of Yugoslavia, the groom's first cousin, once removed

Politicians and diplomats
  Margaret Thatcher, Prime Minister of the United Kingdom, and Mr Denis Thatcher 
  François Mitterrand, President of the French Republic
  Karl Carstens, President of the Federal Republic of Germany
  Robert Muldoon, Prime Minister of New Zealand, and Mrs Thea Muldoon
  Nancy Reagan, First Lady of the United States

Governors-general
  Sir Zelman Cowen, Governor-General of Australia, and Lady Cowen
  Sir Gerald Cash, Governor-General of the Bahamas, and Lady Cash
  Sir Deighton Lisle Ward, Governor-General of Barbados, and Lady Ward
  Mr Edward Schreyer, Governor-General of Canada, and Mrs Schreyer
  Ratu Sir George Cakobau, Governor-General of Fiji, and Lady Cakobau
  Sir Paul Scoon, Governor-General of Grenada, and Lady Scoon
  Sir Florizel Glasspole, Governor-General of Jamaica, and Lady Glasspole
  Sir Dayendranath Burrenchobay, Governor-General of Mauritius, and Lady Burenchobay
  Sir David Beattie, Governor-General of New Zealand, and Lady Beattie
  Sir Tore Lokoloko, Governor-General of Papua New Guinea, and Lady Lokoloko
  Sir Baddeley Devesi, Governor-General of the Solomon Islands, and Lady Devesi
  Sir Sydney Gun-Munro, Governor-General of St. Vincent and the Grenadines

Courtiers

 The Duchess of Grafton, Mistress of the Robes
 The Rt Hon. Sir Philip Moore, Private Secretary to The Queen
 Vice-Admiral Sir Peter Ashmore, Master of the Household
 Lieutenant-Colonel Blair Stewart-Wilson, Deputy Master of the Household
 Squadron Leader Adam Wise, Equerry-in-Waiting
 The Hon. Edward Adeane, Private Secretary to The Prince of Wales
 Mr Francis Cornish, Assistant Private Secretary to The Prince of Wales
 Major John Winter, Equerry to The Prince of Wales
 Mr Oliver Everett, Private Secretary to The Princess of Wales

Other

 Carolyn Pride, bride’s former flatmate & friend
 Anne Bolton, bride’s former flatmate & friend
 Virginia Pittman, bride’s former flatmate & friend
 Sarah Ferguson, bride’s friend
 Mary Robertson, bride’s former employer with her son Patrick
 Kay King, bride’s former co-worker
 Camilla Parker Bowles, groom’s friend with her son Tom Parker Bowles (groom’s godson)

References

External links
 Those who came, and some who stayed away, The Sydney Morning Herald, July 30, 1981.
 Inside St. Paul's: who's who and who's where, The Sunday Times, July 29, 1981

1981 in England
Charles III
Diana, Princess of Wales
Wedding ceremony participants
Wedding of Prince Charles and Lady Diana Spencer